is a Japanese football player. He plays for FC Imabari.

Club statistics
Updated to 20 February 2020.

References

External links
Profile at FC Imabari

1991 births
Living people
University of Tsukuba alumni
Association football people from Tokyo
Japanese footballers
J2 League players
Japan Football League players
Zweigen Kanazawa players
FC Imabari players
Association football midfielders